The Electoral Coalition for the Hungarians (MVSZ) was a short-lived electoral coalition in Hungary, formed by the Hungarian Freedom Party, which split from the Freedom Party (SZP) earlier to contest the 1994 parliamentary election.

Its sole candidate in Miskolc received only 211 votes, and the electoral coalition was dissolved shortly thereafter.

Election results

National Assembly

References

Sources

Defunct political party alliances in Hungary
1993 establishments in Hungary
1994 disestablishments in Hungary